Trimethylsilylacetylene is the organosilicon compound with the formula .  A colorless liquid, "tms acetylene", as it is also called, is used as a source of "HC2−" in organic synthesis.

Use 
Trimethylsilylacetylene is used in Sonogashira couplings as the equivalent of acetylene. Using this protected alkyne, as opposed to acetylene itself, prevents further coupling reactions. The trimethylsilyl group can then be cleaved off with TBAF or DBU, either separately or as part of a one-pot Sonogashira reaction to form phenylacetylene derivatives. A less expensive alternative reagent is 2-methylbut-3-yn-2-ol, which after alkynylation is deprotected with base.

Trimethylsilylacetylene is commercially available. It may also be prepared in a manner similar to other silyl compounds: deprotonation of acetylene with a Grignard reagent, followed by reaction with trimethylsilyl chloride.

Trimethylsilylacetylene is a precursor to 1,4-bis(trimethylsilyl)buta-1,3-diyne, a protected form of 1,3-butadiyne.

History
Trimethylsilylacetylene was first synthesized in 1959 by Heinz Günter Viehe. He reduced chloro(trimethylsilyl)acetylene by reaction with phenyllithium in diethyl ether and proceeded with subsequent hydrolysis.

References

Ethynyl compounds
Carbosilanes
Trimethylsilyl compounds